Crime Doctor's Man Hunt is a 1946 American mystery film directed by William Castle and starring Warner Baxter, Ellen Drew and William Frawley. It is part of the Crime Doctor series of films made by Columbia Pictures.

The film's sets were designed by the German art director Hans Radon.

Plot summary

Partial cast
 Warner Baxter as Dr. Robert Ordway  
 Ellen Drew as Irene Cotter  
 William Frawley as Inspector Harry B. Manning  
 Frank Sully as Rigger  
 Claire Carleton as Ruby Farrell  
 Bernard Nedell as Waldo  
 Jack Lee as Sgt. Bradley  
 Francis Pierlot as Gerald Cotter

References

Bibliography
 Erickson, Hal. From Radio to the Big Screen: Hollywood Films Featuring Broadcast Personalities and Programs. McFarland, 2014.

External links
 
 
 
 

1946 films
1946 mystery films
1940s English-language films
American mystery films
Films directed by William Castle
Columbia Pictures films
American black-and-white films
Films scored by Paul Sawtell
Crime Doctor (character) films
1940s American films